Multikulti is a slogan of the multiculturalism public policy approach. Its etymological origin is with the German progressive movements of the 1970s and 1980s. It was popularised by the German Green Party and gained popularity throughout Europe.

References

External links
multikulti.org.uk, British site offering "information, advice, guidance and learning materials" in different languages
multikulti.de, German radio station (German)
multikulti.eu, friends of the former German radio station 'radiomultikulti'(rbb)(German)
multicult20.de, internet radio (German + other languages), follower of the former 'radiomultikulti' (rbb)
multikulti.com, Polish site on Multikulti music (Polish)
multikulti.at, Austrian site organising Multikulti festivities (German)
multikulti.ru, (Russian)
multikulti.nl, Dutch foundation on intercultural exchange
multikulti.it, Italian site

Slogans
German words and phrases
Multiculturalism in Europe

de:Multikulti